

Films

References

1983 in LGBT history
1983